

Siegfried Obermeier (Munich, 21 January 1936 - Oberschleißheim near Munich, 21 January 2011) was a German author of historical novels and popular history books. He was editor of The Secret Diaries of Ludwig II of Bavaria 1976. In 1978 he issued his first novel, initially under the penname Carl de Scott, a novelisation of the second life of Judas Iscariot. His Jesus in India book "Starb Jesus in Kaschmir?" made it to the Year Bestseller List of the Spiegel in 1983.

Works

Non fiction
 Tourist guidebook to Carinthia 1974
Katia Mann, Meine ungeschriebenen Memoiren, - The unwritten memoires of Katia Mann Frankfurt 1974 
 Münchens Goldene Jahre (The Golden Years of Munich) 1976
 Walter von der Vogelweide Der Spielmann des Reiches. Biography 1980
 Richard Löwenherz. König, Ritter, Abenteurer - Richard the Lionheart Biography 1982
 Starb Jesus in Kaschmir? Das Geheimnis seines Lebens und Wirkens in Indien 1983
 Das geheime Tagebuch König Ludwig II. (editor) 1986
 Die Muse von Rom, Angelika Kauffmann und ihre Zeit - Biography of Angelika Kauffmann, 1987
 Ludwig der Bayer. Herzog und Kaiser Biografie 1989 
 Magie und Geheimnis der alten Religionen 1993 
 Die unheiligen Väter. Gottes Stellvertreter zwischen Machtgier und Frömmigkeit. Geschichte der Päpste, 1995
 Verlorene Kindheit. Erinnerungen aus der Kriegszeit autobiography 2006 
 Eine kurze Geschichte des Monotheismus 2008

Fiction
 Kreuz und Adler - Das zweite Leben des Judas Ischariot. The Second Life of Judas Iscariot. Novel 1978
 München leuchtet übers Jahr. Ein bayrischer Roman. novel 1985 	
 Mein Kaiser, mein Herr. Ein Roman aus der Zeit Karls des Großen. novel 1986 
 ..und baute ihr einen Tempel. Roman um Ramses II. novel 1987 
 Im Schatten des Feuerbergs. Der Roman Siziliens. novel 1989 
 Caligula. Der grausame Gott. Novel 1990
 Würd' ich mein Herz der Liebe weihn... Wolfgang Amadeus. novel on Mozart1991
 Torquemada. Der Grossinquisitor - Symbol für Angst und Schrecken. novel 1992 	
 Im Zeichen der Lilie. novel on Gilles de Rais and Joan of Arc 1994 	
 Kleopatra. Im Zeichen der Schlange. Ein historischer Roman. 1996 
 Die Hexenwaage. Ein Kriminalroman aus dem 17. Jahrhundert. 1997
 Die schwarze Lucretia. Historischer Kriminalroman. 1998 
 Echnaton. Im Zeichen der Sonne. novel on Akhnaton 1998 
 Don Juan. Der Mann, den die Frauen liebten novel 2000 
 Sappho novel 2001
 Messalina. Die lasterhafte Kaiserin. Novel on Valeria Messalina 2002 
 "Kreuz und Adler" Die Geschichte des Judas. 2002 (rewritten)
 Salomo und die Königin von Saba. 2004 
 Um Liebe und Tod. Das lasterhafte Leben des François Villon. novel 2005
 Das Spiel der Kurtisanen; novel 2008
 Der Narr und die Hexe: Ein Agnes-Bernauer-Roman. Novel on Agnes Bernauer mistress of the Duke of Bavaria. 2010
 Bianca Lancia Die Buhle des Kaisers 2011

References

1936 births
2011 deaths
20th-century German novelists
21st-century German novelists
Writers from Munich
German non-fiction writers